Daniel Goddard (born 1983) is a British slalom canoeist who competed at the international level from 1998 to 2012.

He won a bronze medal in the C1 team event at the 2006 ICF Canoe Slalom World Championships in Prague and a bronze medal in the C2 team event at the 2009 ICF Canoe Slalom World Championships in La Seu d'Urgell. He also won a silver and a bronze in the C2 team event at the European Championships.

His C2 partner from 2007 to 2008 was Nick Smith and then from 2009 to 2010 it was Colin Radmore.

World Cup individual podiums

1 Oceania Canoe Slalom Open counting for World Cup points

References

12 September 2009 final results for the men's C2 team slalom event for the 2009 ICF Canoe Slalom World Championships. - accessed 12 September 2009.

British male canoeists
Living people
1983 births
Medalists at the ICF Canoe Slalom World Championships